Dragan Slišković (21 January 1942 – 31 July 2009) was a Yugoslav footballer who played as midfielder.

Playing career

Club career
Dragan started his career as an 11 years old in the football school of Partizan, Belgrade. That generation of youth in Partizan won the Cup of Yugoslavia twice. With the first team, he won the Cup of Yugoslavia in seasons 1960/61, 61/62 as well as 1962/63. 
In 1964, he was invited to join Hajduk - Split at the time when in was at the very bottom of the Yugoslav league. With the golden generation of Hajduk Split he won the 1967 Yugoslav Cup. He was a highly technical player with 'Filigran' dribbling skills. His foot size 38 was a curiosity. 
After several successful years in F.C Liege and St.Die, he returned to Hajduk as a scout and coach for the well-known Hajduk Youth Academy. For 30 years, he brought to fame generations of exceptional players like Alen Boksic, Slaven Bilic, Aljosa Asanovic, etc. He also excelled as the coach of F.C Libreville, Gabon as well as the selector of the Gabon National Team.

Honours
Hajduk Split 
 Yugoslav Cup: 1966–67

References

External links
 

1943 births
2009 deaths
Yugoslav First League players
HNK Hajduk Split players
Yugoslav footballers
FK Partizan players
Association football midfielders
Burials at Lovrinac Cemetery